Eric Sweet (2 March 1918 – 14 December 2005) was an  Australian rules footballer who played with South Melbourne in the Victorian Football League (VFL).

Notes

External links 

1918 births
2005 deaths
Australian rules footballers from Western Australia
Sydney Swans players
East Perth Football Club players